This article lists the winners and nominees for the NAACP Image Award for Outstanding Performance by a Youth (Series, Special, Television Movie or Limited-series). The award was first given during the 1996 ceremony and called Outstanding Performance in a Youth/Children's Series or Special. It was later renamed to award performances by young performers in all types of shows. Since its conception, Raven-Symoné holds the record for the most wins with five.

Winners and nominees
Winners are listed first and highlighted in bold.

1990s

2000s

2010s

2020s

Multiple wins and nominations

Wins

 5 wins
 Raven-Symoné

 4 wins
 LeVar Burton

 Marsai Martin
 Keke Palmer

 2 wins
 Denzel Washington

Nominations

 7 nominations
 LeVar Burton

 6 nominations
 Miles Brown
 Marsai Martin

 5 nominations
 Tommy Davidson
 Keke Palmer
 Raven-Symoné

 4 nominations
 Lonnie Chavis
 China Anne McClain
 Kyla Pratt

 3 nominations
 Nick Cannon
 Selena Gomez
 Kyle Massey

 Jo Marie Payton
 Lyric Ross

 2 nominations
 Kevin Clash
 Loretta Devine
 Kathleen Herles
 Alex R. Hibbert
 Lil' JJ
 Kel Mitchell
 Fatima Ptacek
 Lance Robertson
 Caitlin Sanchez
 Cree Summer
 Kenan Thompson
 Denzel Washington
 Lynn Whitfield
 Zendaya

References

NAACP Image Awards